Pic de Tenneverge is a mountain of the Chablais Alps, located between the French department of Haute-Savoie and the Swiss canton of Valais. Its summit is 2,985 metre-high and lies within France, 300 metres west of the border with Switzerland (2,951 m). The mountain is located between Sixt-Fer-à-Cheval (France) and Lac d'Emosson (Switzerland).

References

External links

Pic de Tenneverge on Hikr

Mountains of Haute-Savoie
Mountains partially in Switzerland
Mountains of the Alps